Malini & Co. is a 2015 Indian Telugu-language action film based on terrorism. The film stars Poonam Pandey, Samrat Reddy, and Suman.

Plot
The film deals with the life of a woman Masseuse.

Cast
Poonam Pandey as Malini
Samrat Reddy as Dharmendra
Suman
Samba Siva 
Ajay Rathnam
Zakir Hussain
Ravi Kale
Kavya Singh
Jeeva

Soundtrack
The music was composed by K.Veeru and K.Gopal and released by Vega Music. All Lyrics were written by Veeru K.

References

External links
 

2015 films
Indian erotic films
Films about terrorism in India
2015 action films
2010s Telugu-language films
Indian erotic thriller films